Achalpur railway station serves Achalpur in Amravati district in the Indian state of Maharashtra.  It is the terminal station on narrow-gauge Murtajapur Junction–Achalpur line of Shakuntala Railway.

The Shakuntala Railway is the only privately owned railway in India. The company, Killick-Nixon, originally British is now in Indian hands. The company operated a ZD steam engine on the run until 1994.

References

Railway stations in Amravati district
Railway stations opened in 1912
1912 establishments in India